Airport is an elevated rail station and southern terminus on the Red and Gold lines of the Metropolitan Atlanta Rapid Transit Authority (MARTA) rail system, located at Hartsfield Jackson Atlanta International Airport. It is served by the Gold Line at all times, while the Red Line generally serves it all day until 8:30 PM on weekdays and 8:50 PM on weekends when there is no scheduled track maintenance. It features one of only two Ridestores, the only other one being at Five Points.

The upper level consists of an island platform between two tracks, while the mezzanine contains the fare gates inside the airport terminal. Since all trains are northbound from here, the island platform is set up such that the "southbound" side is for Doraville (Gold Line) trains and the "northbound" side is for North Springs (Red Line) trains. This is the second busiest railway station on the MARTA system, only surpassed by Five Points.

This station provides access to the airport's  North and South Terminals. Free transfer service is provided outside and across the street by the ATL Skytrain to the Georgia International Convention Center and the new Consolidated Rental Car Facility.

The Airport station is located within the city limits of College Park and is the only station in Clayton County, while all others are in either Fulton or DeKalb counties.

History
The Airport station was constructed in the late 1970s as part of the current Hartsfield-Jackson midfield terminal complex, which opened on September 21, 1980. However, it was not connected to the rest of the system with the extension of the South Line to the airport in 1988, which also included the College Park station.

Station layout

Nearby landmarks and popular destinations
Hartsfield–Jackson Atlanta International Airport
R. L. Brown, Jr. Grady Medical Center (located inside the airport)
Georgia International Convention Center and Gateway Center (accessed by ATL SkyTrain)

Other transit connections
ATL SkyTrain automated people mover to the Georgia International Convention Center and Consolidated Rental Car Facility
The Plane Train - automated people mover within the airport and underground for travel between terminals

References

External links
MARTA Station Page
Station Overview, including a video tour
MARTA Guide

Gold Line (MARTA)
Red Line (MARTA)
Metropolitan Atlanta Rapid Transit Authority stations
Railway stations in the United States opened in 1988
Airport railway stations in the United States
MARTA
Railway stations in Atlanta
1988 establishments in Georgia (U.S. state)